William Warda is an Iraqi–Assyrian journalist and human rights campaigner. He is a former leading member of Iraq's Assyrian Democratic Movement.

Career
Warda was born in Mosul, Iraq in 1961 and studied civil engineering at the University of Mosul. He joined the Assyrian Democratic Movement (Zowaa) in the early 1990s. In 2000 he became the editor-in-chief of the newspaper Bahra and the CEO of Ashur TV in Dohuk.

In 2005, Warda and his wife, Pascale Warda, led in the founding of the Hammurabi Human Rights Organization, a non-profit group that monitors and opposes human rights violations against members of Iraq's minority groups. Since 2015, Warda has served as chairman of the Alliance of Iraqi Minorities, a coalition of civil society groups working to forge better cooperation among Iraq's disparate, and often divided, minority communities—including Assyrian Christians, Shabaks, Mandaeans, Yarsanis (Kaka'is), Baha'is, Faili Kurds and Yazidis. He is also the webmaster of a number of websites including christiansofiraq.com.

In 2019, the U.S. State Department awarded William and Pascale Warda one of its inaugural International Religious Freedom Awards.

Personal life
William Warda and Pascale Warda, the former minister of Immigration and Refugees in the Iraqi Interim Government, have two daughters, Shlama and Neshma.

References

Assyrian nationalists
Iraqi Assyrian people
1961 births
Living people
People from Mosul
Assyrian Democratic Movement politicians